Rafael Domingo Oslé (Logrono, La Rioja, 1963) is a Spanish professor of law and legal historian.

Education
Rafael Domingo received his university law degree and a doctorate in law from the University of Navarra. He conducted legal research as an Alexander von Humboldt research fellow at Ludwig Maximilian University of Munich, Germany (1989), and as a visiting scholar at the Columbia Law School in New York City.

Academic and professional activities
In 1989, Domingo was awarded tenure at University of Cantabria and promoted to associate professor's rank. Two years later, in 1993 Domingo was elevated to the rank of professor of law. In 1995, Domingo joined the University of Navarra School of Law, where he served as dean (1996–1999), and founding director of the Garrigues Chair in Global Law.

In 2011–12, Domingo served as Straus and Emile Noël joint Fellow at New York University (NYU) School of Law. Since 2012 he has served as Francisco de Vitoria Senior Fellow and the Spruill Family Professor of Law and Religion at the Center for the Study of Law and Religion at Emory University in Atlanta, GA. In 2020 Domingo was appointed the Alvaro d'Ors Professor of Law at the Institute of Culture and Society in the University of Navarra.

Honors and awards
Domingo has been awarded the Toribio Rodriguez de Mendoza Medal of Honor from the Peruvian Constitutional Court (2006); the Rafael Martinez Emperador Award from the Spanish Council of the Judiciary (2007); the Medal of Honor from the Paraguayan Academy of Law (2009), the Jose Barandiaran Medal of Honor from the National University of San Marcos (2016), and the Honorary Diploma from the Congress of the Republic of Peru (2016).

Domingo received honorary doctorates in law from the Inca Garcilaso University (2012) and the University of Saint Ignatius of Loyola (2016), both in Lima (Peru).

Global law, Roman law, and law and religion
Domingo believes that the dislocations of the worldwide economic crisis, the necessity of a system of global justice to address crime against humanity, and the notorious democratic deficit of international institutions highlight the need for an innovative and truly global legal system -one that permits humanity to reorder itself according to acknowledged global needs and evolving consciousness.

Domingo is a supporter of the Campaign for the Establishment of a United Nations Parliamentary Assembly, an organization that advocates for democratic reformation of the United Nations.

In the field of Roman law, Domingo has analyzed the nature of the Roman concepts of auctoritas (moral authority) and potestas (constituted power).

In law and religion, Domingo has advocated for a theistic conception of the secular legal system that also includes and protects non-theistic approaches.

Major publications
 The New Global Law (Cambridge University Press, 2010)
 God and the Secular Legal System (Cambridge University Press, 2016)
 Roman Law. An Introduction (Routledge, 2018)
 Great Christian Jurist in Spanish History (Cambridge University Press, 2018), co-editor with Javier Martínez-Torrón
 Great Christian Jurist in French History (Cambridge University Press, 2019), co-editor with Olivier Descamps
 Christianity and Global Law (Routledge, 2020), coeditor con John Witte, Jr.
 Law and the Christian Tradition in Italy (Routledge, 2020), co-editor with Orazio Condorelli
Estudios sobre el primer título del Edicto del Pretor [Studies on the First Part of the Praetor's Edict] (Universidad de Santiago de Compostela, 1992, 1993, 1995)
Auctoritas [On Authority] (Ariel, 1999)
Código civil japonés. Estudio preliminar, traducción y notas [The Japanese Civil Code. Preliminary Study, Translation and Notes] (Marcial Pons 2000), in collaboration with Nobuo Hayashi.
 Juristas universales [Universal Jurists] (editor and coordinator), 4 vols. (Marcial Pons, 2004)
 Ex Roma ius [From Rome, Law] (Thomson Aranzadi, 2005)
Álvaro d’Ors, una introducción a su obra [Alvaro d’Ors, an Introduction to his Works] (Thomson Aranzadi, 2005)
Principios de Derecho Global. 1000 reglas jurídicas y aforismos comentados [Principles of Global Law. 1000 Legal Rules and Commented Aphorisms] (editor and coordinator) (Thomson Aranzadi, 2006)
¿Qué es el Derecho Global?  [What is Global Law?] (Thomson Reuters Aranzadi, 2008)

References

https://en.unpacampaign.org/supporters/overview/?mapcountry=ES&mapgroup=all

External links
 Rafael Domingo profile at Emory University School of Law
 https://www.jstor.org/action/doBasicSearch?Query=%22Rafael+Domingo%22
 https://cnnespanol.cnn.com/author/rafael-domingo-osle/
 https://scholar.google.com/citations?user=KRizDHkAAAAJ&hl=en
 https://www.unav.edu/en/web/catedra-alvaro-dors/equipo/titular-de-la-catedra
 https://www.unav.edu/en/web/investigacion/nuestros-investigadores/detalle-investigadores-cv?investigadorId=25041&investigador=Domingo%20Osle,%20Rafael
 https://law.strathmore.edu/rafael-domingo/

20th-century Spanish lawyers
University of Navarra alumni
1963 births
Living people
Academic staff of the University of Navarra
Academic staff of the University of Cantabria
Emory University faculty
Corresponding Members of the Austrian Academy of Sciences